Salei, also transliterated Saley and Salej, is a surname. Notable people include:

 Dzmitry Salei (born 1989), Belarusian-Azerbaijani Paralympic swimmer
 Raman Salei (born 1994), Belarusian-Azerbaijani Paralympic swimmer
 Ruslan Salei (1974–2011), Belarusian ice hockey player

See also
 
 Cupiennius salei, a species of spider

Belarusian-language surnames